Newcastle upon Tyne North is a constituency represented in the House of Commons of the UK Parliament since 2010 by Catherine McKinnell of the Labour Party.

History
Parliament created this seat under the Representation of the People Act 1918 for the general election later that year. It was one of four divisions of the parliamentary borough of Newcastle-upon-Tyne, which had previously been represented by one two-member seat.

The constituency included much of Newcastle city centre from 1950 to 1983 - despite the fact that the Newcastle upon Tyne Central constituency was retained, albeit with redrawn boundaries.

Following the local government reorganisation arising from the Local Government Act 1972, major boundary changes resulted in a constituency composed entirely of wards that did not form any part of the pre-1983 seat. The majority of the old Newcastle upon Tyne North wards moved to Newcastle upon Tyne Central. The newly constituted seat comprised northern and western suburbs of the expanded metropolitan borough of the City of Newcastle upon Tyne.

Boundaries

1918–1950 

 The County Borough of Newcastle upon Tyne wards of Dene, Heaton, Jesmond, St Andrew's, and St Thomas.

1950–1983 

 The County Borough of Newcastle upon Tyne wards of Arthur's Hill, Elswick, Jesmond, Sandyford, and Westgate.

Boundaries redrawn to take account of expansion of the County Borough and redistribution of wards. Dene and Heaton transferred to Newcastle upon Tyne East. Expanded westwards and into parts of the city centre, gaining Arthur's Hill and Elswick from Newcastle upon Tyne West and Westgate from Newcastle upon Tyne Central.

1983–2010 
 The City of Newcastle upon Tyne wards of Castle, Denton, Fawdon, Grange, Lemington, Newburn, Westerhope, and Woolsington.

Following the reorganisation of local authorities as a result of the Local Government Act 1972, the constituencies within the City of Newcastle upon Tyne were completely redrawn. The contents of the existing seat formed no part of newly constituted version. With the exception of Sandyford, which was transferred to Newcastle upon Tyne East, the existing seat was absorbed into a redrawn Newcastle upon Tyne Central.

The new seat was made up of western parts of the now abolished constituency of Newcastle upon Tyne West, comprising the former Urban District of Newburn, the parts of Castle Ward transferred to the new metropolitan borough, previously in Hexham and a small area transferred from Wallsend.

2010–present 

 The City of Newcastle upon Tyne wards of Castle, Denton, East Gosforth, Fawdon, Lemington, Newburn, Parklands, Westerhope, and Woolsington.

Minor changes due to redistribution of ward boundaries.

Political history
From its creation in 1918, the seat was a safe Conservative Party seat— including six years of representation by Gwilym Lloyd George, who was aligned to the National Liberal Party but served as Home Secretary for almost three years until 1957 in a Conservative government. This continued until the 1983 general election, when the major boundary changes resulted in the majority of the old wards being moved to Newcastle upon Tyne Central, which the Conservatives won in 1983, while the new Newcastle North became a safe Labour seat, although in 1983 Labour's majority was just over 2,500 votes in a relatively close three-way race. 

Labour won the seat in the first election under the new boundaries with a majority of just over 2,500 votes in a relatively close three-way race, despite a landslide defeat on the national scale. It has been a safe Labour seat ever since, with the Liberal Democrats being the greatest challengers in 2005 and 2010, and the Conservatives finishing in second place in 2015, 2017 and 2019.

Members of Parliament

Elections

Elections in the 2010s

Elections in the 2000s

Elections in the 1990s

Elections in the 1980s

The 1983 result is classed as a hold for Labour, rather than a gain from the Conservatives, because the pre-1983 Newcastle-upon-Tyne North constituency, which was a Conservative-held seat, covered a substantially different area, so, aside from the name, the two seats are essentially entirely different. The constituency which replaced the pre-1983 Newcastle-upon-Tyne North constituency, Newcastle-upon-Tyne Central, was won by the Conservatives and is classed as a hold for the Conservatives, as they were incumbent party in the pre-1983 Newcastle-upon-Tyne North seat. By contrast, this constituency was the closest successor to the pre-1983 Newcastle-upon-Tyne West seat where Robert Brown had been MP.

Elections in the 1970s

Elections in the 1960s

Elections in the 1950s

Elections in the 1940s

Elections in the 1930s

Elections in the 1920s

Election in the 1910s

See also
 1940 Newcastle upon Tyne North by-election
 1957 Newcastle upon Tyne North by-election
 List of parliamentary constituencies in Tyne and Wear
 History of parliamentary constituencies and boundaries in Tyne and Wear
 History of parliamentary constituencies and boundaries in Northumberland

Notes

References

Sources
 

Constituencies of the Parliament of the United Kingdom established in 1918
Politics of Newcastle upon Tyne
Parliamentary constituencies in Tyne and Wear